Green v Matheson [1989] NZCA 195; [1989] 3 NZLR 564; [1990] NZAR 49  is a cited case in New Zealand regarding compensation for medical misadventure.

Background
Matheson was a victim of the "unfortunate experiment" at the National Women's Hospital. Doctor Green was her gynaecologist. Barred by the Accident Compensation Act to sue for negligence, she sued instead for trespass to her person.

Held
The Court of Appeal sitting as a bench of 5, ruled that her claim came under the term of medical misadventure, which was barred under the Act

References

Court of Appeal of New Zealand cases
New Zealand tort case law
1989 in New Zealand law
1989 in case law